Phil Ritchie (born 1959) is an Australian former rugby league footballer who played in the 1980s.

Playing career
Ritchie began his career at North Sydney and played four seasons with the club between 1981-1984. He then transferred to the St. George Dragons in 1985 and played Hooker in their 1985 Grand Final team that was defeated 7-6 by Canterbury-Bankstown Bulldogs.  
He retired at the conclusion on the 1986 season.

References

1959 births
North Sydney Bears players
St. George Dragons players
Australian rugby league players
Living people
Rugby league hookers
Place of birth missing (living people)